Johan Lindell (born 20 August 1964) is a Swedish sailor. He competed in the Flying Dutchman event at the 1992 Summer Olympics.

References

External links
 

1964 births
Living people
Swedish male sailors (sport)
Olympic sailors of Sweden
Sailors at the 1992 Summer Olympics – Flying Dutchman
People from Eslöv Municipality
Sportspeople from Skåne County